Nissan Motor Car Carrier Co., Ltd. (Abbreviation: NMCC) is a Japanese roll-on/roll-off shipping company owned by Nissan Motors (60%) and Mitsui O.S.K. Lines (40%).

Overview
The company fleet includes 9 deep sea Car carrier vessels, each one with a gross tonnage between 46,000 and 60,000 GT.

The main business is the sea carriage of new Nissan and sister brands vehicles manufactured in Japan and Mexico, all over the world and specifically to US, Europe, intra Asia and Middle East.

Its subsidiary, Euro Marine Carrier is a short sea operator in Europe, also in charge of carrying Nissan models to more peripheral European ports, not directly called by NMCC.

NMCC also has a cooperative business relationship with the Norwegian shipping company, Höegh Autoliners.

In Europe, Port of Amsterdam is used as the home port for all main discharging and transhipment activities of imported and exported Nissan cars.

In August 2017 a large fine was applied by the South Korean Fair Trade Commission against Mitsui O.S.K. Lines and Nissan Motor Car Carrier for antitrust law violation.

Select list of ships

This is a dynamic list and may never be able to satisfy particular standards for completeness. You can help by expanding it with reliably sourced entries.

 Asian Spirit
 Jupiter Spirit
 Leo Spirit
 Nordic Spirit
 Pleiades Spirit
 Venus Spirit
 World Spirit
 United Spirit
 Luna Spirit
 Andromeda Spirit

See also
United European Car Carriers
KESS - K Line Europe Short Sea
Euro Marine Logistics
Toyofuji Shipping
Nippon Yusen Kaisha

References

Fleet gallery

External links
Official website

Shipping companies of Japan
Ro-ro shipping companies
Car carrier shipping companies
Nissan